The Turkey women's national under-19 football team is the national under-19 football team of Turkey and is governed by the Turkish Football Federation.

Current squad 

Head coach:  Begüm Üresin

Achievements

UEFA Women's U19 Championship record

Results and fixtures 
 The following is a list of match results in the last 12 months, as well as any future matches that have been scheduled.
 Friendly matches are not included.

 Source: Official match results of Turkey, TFF.org

Individual records

Most capped players 
Players in bold are still active.

Top goalscorers 

Goalscorers with an equal number of goals are ranked in chronological order of reaching the milestone. Bold indicates still active players.

Notable former players 

Güzide Alçu (2014)
Hasret Altındere (1998)

Goalkeepers
Selda Akgöz (2010–2012)
Ezgi Çağlar (2007–2010)
Nurcan Çelik (1997–1998)
Sude Mihri Çınar (2013–2014)
Özlem Gezer (2008–2010)
Meryem Koç (2014–2015)
İrem Damla Şahin (2018–2019)
Gamze Nur Yaman (2016–2018)
Duygu Yılmaz (2006–2007)

Defenders
Şevval Alpavut (2014–2017)
Feride Bakır (2010)
Çiğdem Belci (2003)
Kübra Berber (2012–2015)
Demet Bozkurt (2015)
Serra Çağan (2013–2015)
Sevinç Çorlu (2008)
Emine Demir (2011–2012)
Selin Dişli (2014–2016)
Sibel Duman (2008)
Medine Erkan (2013–2014)
Esra Erol (2001–2003)
Yaşam Göksu (2012–2014)
Leyla Güngör (2013–2014)
Bahar Güvenç (2013–2015)
Didem Karagenç (2009–2012)
Zübeyde Kaya (2007–2010)
Beyza Kocatürk (2014–2015)
Serenay Öziri (2012)
Aslı Canan Sabırlı (2006–2010)
 Nihan Su (1997–1999)
Esra Sibel Tezkan (2010–2012)
Berna Yeniçeri (2012–2015)

Midfielders
Derya Arhan (2015–2018)
Aybüke Arslan (2010–2012)
Remziye Bakır (2014–2015)
Hilal Başkol (2012–2013)
İlayda Civelek (2015–2017)
Ecem Cumert (2016)
Hanife Demiryol (2009–2010)
Elif Deniz (2010–2012)
Azize Erdoğan (2013–2015)
Melisa Ertürk (2010–2012)
Emine Ecem Esen (2011–2012)
Buse Güngör (2010–2012)
Başak İçinözbebek (2012)
Fatma Kara (2007–2010)
Arzu Karabulut (2006–2010)
Tuğba Karataş (2009)
Bilge Su Koyun (2016–2018)
Esra Özkan (2013–2014)
Selin Sivrikaya (2013–2015)
Dilara Türk (2015)
Ece Türkoğlu (2014–2016)
Cansu Yağ (2006–2008)
Aylin Yaren (2006–2007)

Forwards
Semanur Akbaş (2013–2014)
Zelal Baturay (2013–2015)
Eylül Elgalp (2006–2010)
Emine Gümüş (2010)
Zeynep Koçer (2015–2017)
Özge Özel (2006–2009)
Hatice Bahar Özgüvenç (2000–2002)
Ebru Topçu (2012–2015)
Yağmur Uraz (2006–2008)
Aycan Yanaç (2015)

Managers

See also 

 Women's football in Turkey
 Turkey women's national football team
 Turkey women's national under-21 football team
 Turkey women's national under-17 football team

References

External links 
 Turkey women's national under-19 football team at Turkish Football Federation official website

Women's national under-19 association football teams
under-19
Youth football in Turkey